Deltophora minuta is a moth of the family Gelechiidae. It is found in Brazil (Amazon).

The length of the forewings is 3.5–4 mm. Adults have been recorded on wing in August and September.

References

Moths described in 1979
Deltophora
Taxa named by Klaus Sattler